Berrin Yanıkkaya is a full professor at the Yeditepe University in Turkey.

Academic career

After a 2004 PhD at titled  'Women voices in the city women's self-expression through cultural products in istanbul after 1990s (rock music as a sample case)'  at the Mimar Sinan Fine Arts University, she worked as professor at Yeditepe University in Turkey before moving to the Auckland University of Technology as full professor. She left AUT at the end of 2018.

Selected works 
 Yanıkkaya, Berrin. "Gündelik hayatın suretinde: öteki korkusu, görsel şiddet ve medya." The representation of daily life: the fear of the others, visual violence and the media]. In B. Çoban (Ed.), Medya, Milliyetçilik, Şiddet [Media, Nationalism, Violence]. Istanbul: Su (2009).
 Kejanlıoğlu, D. Beybin, Barış Çoban, Berrin Yanıkkaya, and M. Emre Köksalan. "The user as producer in alternative media? The case of the Independent Communication Network (BIA)." Communications 37, no. 3 (2012): 275–296.

References

External links
 
  

Living people
New Zealand women academics
Academic staff of Yeditepe University
Academic staff of the Auckland University of Technology
Mimar Sinan Fine Arts University alumni
Turkish emigrants to New Zealand
Year of birth missing (living people)